Arundel was twice a parliamentary constituency in the Kingdom of England, the Kingdom of Great Britain, and the United Kingdom. The first incarnation strictly comprised the town centre of Arundel and was a borough constituency in Sussex first enfranchised in 1332 and disfranchised in 1868 under the Reform Act 1867. Arundel initially elected two members, but this was reduced to one in 1832 by the Great Reform Act.

The second incarnation was broader, reaching to Bognor Regis. It was created by the Boundary Commission in the 1974 boundary changes, and existed until 1997. This Arundel seat elected only one member. The territory previously covered by Arundel was split between Arundel & South Downs and Bognor Regis & Littlehampton constituencies.

Members of Parliament

1332-1640

Back to Members of Parliament

1640-1832

Back to Members of Parliament

1832-1868

Back to Members of Parliament

Arundel County Constituency (1974-1997)

Elections

Elections in the 1830s

Elections in the 1840s

Back to Elections

Elections in the 1850s
FitzAlan-Howard's resignation in protest at the passing of the Ecclesiastical Titles Act 1851 caused a by-election.

Back to Elections

Elections in the 1860s

Back to Elections

Elections in the 1970s

Back to elections

Elections in the 1980s

Back to Elections

Elections in the 1990s

Back to Top

See also
List of parliamentary constituencies in West Sussex

Notes and references

Sources
Election results, 1974 - 1997
Concise Dictionary of National Biography (entry on Sir Nicholas Pelham)
D Brunton & D H Pennington, Members of the Long Parliament (London: George Allen & Unwin, 1954)
Cobbett's Parliamentary history of England, from the Norman Conquest in 1066 to the year 1803 (London: Thomas Hansard, 1808) 
 Maija Jansson (ed.), Proceedings in Parliament, 1614 (House of Commons) (Philadelphia: American Philosophical Society, 1988) 
 J Holladay Philbin, Parliamentary Representation 1832 - England and Wales (New Haven: Yale University Press, 1965)

Parliamentary constituencies in South East England (historic)
1332 establishments in England
Constituencies of the Parliament of the United Kingdom disestablished in 1868
Constituencies of the Parliament of the United Kingdom established in 1974
Constituencies of the Parliament of the United Kingdom disestablished in 1997
Arundel